Michael III  (9 January 840 – 24 September 867), also known as Michael the Drunkard, was Byzantine emperor from 842 to 867. Michael III was the third and traditionally last member of the Amorian (or Phrygian) dynasty. He was given the disparaging epithet the Drunkard by the hostile historians of the succeeding Macedonian dynasty, but modern historical research has rehabilitated his reputation to some extent, demonstrating the vital role his reign played in the resurgence of Byzantine power in the 9th century. He was also the youngest person to bear the imperial title, as well as the youngest to succeed as senior emperor.

Life

Early life and regency

Michael was the youngest child of the emperor Theophilos and his empress Theodora. His precise date of birth is uncertain, but the balance of available evidence supports a birthdate in early 840, probably on 9 or 10 January. He was crowned co-emperor soon after, probably on 16 May of the same year. Michael had just turned two years old when his father died, and Michael succeeded him as sole emperor on 20 January 842.

During his minority, the empire was governed by a regency headed by his mother Theodora, her uncle Sergios, and the minister Theoktistos. The empress had iconodule sympathies and deposed Patriarch John VII of Constantinople, replacing him with the iconodule Methodius I in 843. This put an end to the second spell of iconoclasm.

As the emperor was growing up, the courtiers around him fought for influence.  Increasingly fond of his uncle Bardas, Michael invested him with the title kaisar (caesar – at the time a title second only to emperor) and allowed him to murder Theoktistos in November 855.  With the support of Bardas and another uncle, a successful general named Petronas, Michael III overthrew the regency on 15 March 856 and relegated his mother and sisters to a monastery in 857.

Warfare

The internal stabilization of the state was not entirely matched along the frontiers.  Byzantine forces were defeated by the Abbasids in Pamphylia, Crete, and on the border with Syria, but a Byzantine fleet of 85 ships did score a victory over the Arabs in 853. There were also many operations around the Aegean and off the Syrian coast by at least three more fleets, numbering 300 ships total.  Following an expedition led by Michael's uncle and general, Petronas, against the Paulicians from the eastern frontier and the Arab borderlands in 856, the imperial government resettled them in Thrace, thus cutting them off from their coreligionists and populating another border region. Michael was also responsible, as per the writings of Constantine VII, for the subjugation of the Slavs settled in the Peloponnese.

A conflict between the Byzantines and Bulgarian Empire occurred during 855 and 856. The Byzantine Empire wanted to regain its control over some areas of Thrace, including Philippopolis (Plovdiv) and the ports around the Gulf of Burgas on the Black Sea. Byzantine forces, led by the emperor and the caesar Bardas, were successful in reconquering a number of cities – Philippopolis, Develtus, Anchialus and Mesembria among them – as well as the region of Zagora. At the time of this campaign the Bulgarians were distracted by a war with the Franks under Louis the German and the Croatians. In 853 Boris had allied himself to Rastislav of Moravia against the Franks. The Bulgarians were heavily defeated by the Franks; following this, the Moravians changed sides and the Bulgarians then faced threats from Moravia.

Michael III took an active part in the wars against the Abbasids and their vassals on the eastern frontier from 856 to 863, and particularly in 857 when he sent an army of 50,000 men against Emir Umar al-Aqta of Melitene. In 859, he personally led a siege on Samosata, but in 860 had to abandon the expedition to repel an attack by the Rus' on Constantinople. In 863, Petronas defeated and killed the emir of Melitene at the Battle of Lalakaon, and celebrated a triumph in the capital.

Ascendency of Bardas and Christianisation of Bulgaria

Bardas justified his usurpation of the regency by introducing various internal reforms. Under the influence of both Bardas and Photios, Michael presided over the reconstruction of ruined cities and structures, the reopening of closed monasteries, and the reorganization of the imperial university at the Maganaura palace under Leo the Mathematician.  Photios, originally a layman, had entered holy orders and was promoted to the position of patriarch on the dismissal of the troublesome Ignatios in 858. Although a Council of Constantinople in 861 confirmed Photios as patriarch, Ignatios appealed to Pope Nicholas I, who declared Photios illegitimate in 863, leading to the Photian schism.  Michael presided over a synod in 867 in which Photios and the three other eastern patriarchs excommunicated Pope Nicholas and condemned the Latin filioque clause concerning the procession of the Holy Spirit. The conflict over the patriarchal throne and supreme authority within the church was exacerbated by the success of the active missionary efforts launched by Photios.

Under the guidance of Patriarch Photios, Michael sponsored the mission of Saints Cyril and Methodios to the Khazar Khagan in an effort to stop the expansion of Judaism among the Khazars. Although this mission was a failure, their next mission in 863 secured the conversion of Great Moravia and devised the Glagolitic alphabet for writing in Slavonic, thus allowing Slavic-speaking peoples to approach conversion to Orthodox Christianity through their own rather than an alien tongue.

Fearing the potential conversion of Boris I of Bulgaria to Christianity under Frankish influence, Michael III and the Caesar Bardas invaded Bulgaria, imposing the conversion of Boris according to the Byzantine rite as part of the peace settlement in 864. Michael III stood as sponsor, by proxy, for Boris at his baptism. Boris took the additional name of Michael at the ceremony. The Byzantines also allowed the Bulgarians to reclaim the contested border region of Zagora. The conversion of the Bulgarians has been evaluated as one of the greatest cultural and political achievements of the Byzantine Empire.

Rise of Basil the Macedonian and assassination of Michael

Michael III's marriage with Eudokia Dekapolitissa was childless, but the emperor did not want to risk a scandal by attempting to marry his mistress Eudokia Ingerina, daughter of the Varangian (Norse) imperial guard Inger.  The solution he chose was to have Ingerina marry his favorite courtier and chamberlain Basil the Macedonian.  While Michael carried on his relationship with Ingerina, Basil was kept satisfied with the emperor's sister Thekla, whom her brother retrieved from a monastery.  Basil gained increasing influence over Michael, and in April 866 he convinced the emperor that the Caesar Bardas was conspiring against him and was duly allowed to murder Bardas.  Now without serious rivals, Basil was crowned co-emperor on 26 May 866 and was adopted by the much younger Michael III.  This curious development may have been intended to legitimize the eventual succession to the throne of Eudokia Ingerina's son Leo, who was widely believed to be Michael's son. Michael celebrated the birth of Leo with public chariot races, a sport he enthusiastically patronized and participated in.
If ensuring Leo's legitimacy had been Michael's plan, it backfired.  Ostensibly troubled by the favour Michael was beginning to show to another courtier, named Basiliskianos, whom he threatened to raise as another co-emperor, Basil had Michael assassinated as he lay insensible in his bedchamber following a drinking bout on 24 September 867. Basil with a number of his male relatives, plus other accomplices, entered Michael's apartment; the locks had been tampered with and no guard had been placed.  Michael's end was grisly; a man named John of Chaldia killed him, cutting off both the emperor's hands with a sword before finishing him off with a thrust to the heart. Basil, as the sole remaining emperor (Basiliskianos had presumably been disposed of at the same time as Michael), automatically succeeded as the ruling basileus.

Michael's remains were buried in the Philippikos Monastery at Chrysopolis on the Asian shore of the Bosphoros. When Leo VI became ruling emperor in 886, one of his first acts was to have Michael's body exhumed and reburied, with great ceremony, in the imperial mausoleum in the Church of the Holy Apostles in Constantinople. This contributed to the suspicion held by the Byzantine public that Leo was (or at least believed himself to be) Michael's son.

Legacy

The reign and personality of Michael III are difficult to evaluate because of the hostile accounts written by Byzantine authors operating under Basil I and his successors. Byzantine accounts describe Michael's habitual drunkenness, his obsession with chariot racing and his orchestration of public displays mocking the processions and rituals of the church. The impression gained from Arab sources, however, is one of Michael as an active and often successful military commander.

Though Michael III was allegedly prone to squander money, his reign stabilized the economy, and by the year 850 the empire's annual revenues had increased to 3,300,000 nomismata. The definitive end to iconoclasm early in his reign led, unsurprisingly, to a renaissance in visual arts. The Empire made considerable advances in internal organisation and religious cohesion, and it had more than held its own against the Abbasid Caliphate. Most importantly Bulgaria had been transformed into a religious and cultural satellite of Byzantium. Much of the credit for these achievements, however, must go to Theodora and Theoktistos up to 855, and Bardas and Petronas thereafter.

Michael III is referenced in the opening parts of the Primary Chronicle, a major source for the early history of the Slavs. The dates of Michael III's reign, which are firmly known from reliable Byzantine sources, are useful in checking the accuracy of the information provided by that Chronicle - an issue of great importance for Russian and other Slavic historians.

Family
Michael III had no children by his wife Eudokia Dekapolitissa but was conjectured to have fathered one or two sons by his mistress Eudokia Ingerina, who was married to Basil I:
 Leo VI, who succeeded Basil I as emperor in 886
 Stephen I, patriarch of Constantinople.

See also

List of Byzantine emperors

Notes

References

Sources

Primary sources
Recent years have seen the first translations into English of a number of primary sources about Michael III and his times.
 Featherstone, Jeffrey Michael and Signes-Codoñer, Juan (translators). Chronographiae quae Theophanis Continuati nomine fertur Libri I-IV (Chronicle of Theophanes Continuatus Books I-IV, comprising the reigns of Leo V the Armenian to Michael III), Berlin, Boston: De Gruyter, 2015.
 Kaldellis, A. (trans.). On the reigns of the emperors (the history of Joseph Genesios), Canberra: Australian Association for Byzantine Studies; Byzantina Australiensia 11, 1998.
 Ševčenko, Ihor (trans.). Chronographiae quae Theophanis Continuati nomine fertur Liber quo Vita Basilii Imperatoris amplectitur (Chronicle of Theophanes Continuatus comprising the Life of Basil I), Berlin: De Gruyter, 2011.
 Wahlgren, Staffan (translator, writer of introduction and commentary). The Chronicle of the Logothete, Liverpool University Press; Translated Texts for Byzantinists, vol. 7, 2019.
 Wortley, John (trans.). A synopsis of Byzantine history, 811-1057 (the history of John Scylitzes, active 1081), Cambridge University Press, 2010.

Secondary sources
Ahrweiler, H. and Laiou, A.E. (1998) Studies on the Internal Diaspora of the Byzantine Empire, Dumbarton Oaks. 
Bulgarian historical review (2005), United Center for Research and Training in History, Published by Pub. House of the Bulgarian Academy of Sciences, v.33:no.1-4.

Finlay, G. (1856), History of the Byzantine Empire from DCCXVI to MLVII, 2nd Edition, Published by W. Blackwood.
Fossier, R. (1986) The Cambridge illustrated history of the Middle Ages. Cambridge University Press.
 Gjuzelev, V., (1988) Medieval Bulgaria, Byzantine Empire, Black Sea, Venice, Genoa (Centre Culturel du Monde Byzantin). Published by Verlag Baier.
Gregory, Timothy E. (2010). A History of Byzantium. Malden, Massachusetts and West Sussex, United Kingdom: Wiley-Blackwell. .

Tougher, S. (1997) The Reign of Leo VI (886–912): Politics and People. Brill, Leiden.  

830s births
867 deaths
9th-century Byzantine emperors
9th-century murdered monarchs
Phrygian dynasty
Byzantine people of the Arab–Byzantine wars
Assassinated Byzantine emperors
Deaths by blade weapons
Medieval child monarchs
840s in the Byzantine Empire
850s in the Byzantine Empire
860s in the Byzantine Empire
Burials at the Church of the Holy Apostles
Sons of Byzantine emperors